Eugyra are marine tunicates.

Species
 Eugyra adriatica Drasche, 1884
 Eugyra arenosa (Alder & Hancock, 1848)
 Eugyra bilabiata Sluiter, 1887
 Eugyra borealis (Monniot & Monniot, 1977)
 Eugyra brewinae Millar, 1960
 Eugyra communis Nishikawa, 1984
 Eugyra connectens Ärnbäck, 1928
 Eugyra dakarensis (Pizon, 1896)
 Eugyra extrosa Nishikawa, 1984
 Eugyra glutinans (Moeller, 1842)
 Eugyra greenwichensis (Monniot & Monniot, 1974)
 Eugyra hexarhiza Tokioka, 1949
 Eugyra islandica Millar, 1974
 Eugyra japonicus (Oka, 1934)
 Eugyra kerguelenensis Herdman, 1881
 Eugyra malayensis Millar, 1975
 Eugyra mammillata Kott, 1985
 Eugyra millimetra Kott, 1985
 Eugyra molguloides Sluiter, 1904
 Eugyra munida Millar, 1982
 Eugyra myodes Millar, 1962
 Eugyra novaezealandiae Brewin, 1950
 Eugyra pedunculata Traustedt, 1886
 Eugyra pellucida (Macdonald, 1859)
 Eugyra peresi Millar, 1957
 Eugyra polyducta (Monniot & Monniot, 1983)
 Eugyra symmetrica Drasche, 1884
 Eugyra vallatum (Monniot, 1978)

Species names currently considered to be synonyms:
 Eugyra aernbaeckae Millar, 1960: synonym of Pareugyrioides arnbackae (Millar, 1960) 
 Eugyra arctoa Ärnbäck, 1928: synonym of Eugyra glutinans (Moeller, 1842) 
 Eugyra arenata (Stimpson, 1852): synonym of Molgula arenata Stimpson, 1852 
 Eugyra arnbackae Millar, 1960: synonym of Pareugyrioides arnbackae (Millar, 1960) 
 Eugyra asamusi Oka, 1930: synonym of Eugyra glutinans (Moeller, 1842) 
 Eugyra flabelligona Millar, 1975: synonym of Pareugyrioides exigua (Kott, 1972) 
 Eugyra globosa Alder & Hancock, 1870: synonym of Eugyra arenosa (Alder & Hancock, 1848) 
 Eugyra guillei (Monniot, 1994): synonym of Gamaster guillei Monniot, 1994 
 Eugyra guttula (Michaelsen, 1900): synonym of Eugyra kerguelenensis Herdman, 1881 
 Eugyra kerguelensis Herdman, 1882: synonym of Eugyra kerguelenensis Herdman, 1881 
 Eugyra macrentera Millar, 1962: synonym of Pareugyrioides macrentera (Millar, 1962) 
 Eugyra malayanus Millar, 1975: synonym of Eugyra malayensis Millar, 1975 
 Eugyra moretonensis Kott, 1972: synonym of Eugyra molguloides Sluiter, 1904 
 Eugyra peduculata Traustedt, 1886: synonym of Molgula pedunculata Herdman, 1881 
 Eugyra pilularis (Verrill, 1871): synonym of Bostrichobranchus pilularis (Verrill, 1871) 
 Eugyra symetrica Drasche, 1884: synonym of Eugyra symmetrica Drasche, 1884 
 Eugyra translucida Kiaer, 1896: synonym of Eugyra arenosa (Alder & Hancock, 1848) 
 Eugyra woermani Michaelsen, 1914: synonym of Eugyra dakarensis (Pizon, 1896) 
 Eugyra woermanni Michaelsen, 1914: synonym of Eugyra dakarensis (Pizon, 1896)

References

Stolidobranchia
Tunicate genera